"I'll Meet You at Midnight" is a song by the British rock band Smokie from their 1976 studio album Midnight Café. In September of the same year it was released as a single. It was the third and final single from the album, after "Something's Been Making Me Blue" and "Wild Wild Angels".

Background and writing
The song was written by Nicky Chinn and Mike Chapman and produced by Mike Chapman in association with Nicky Chinn.

Charts

Weekly charts

Year-end charts

Cover versions
Chris Norman included his solo cover of the song on his 2000 studio album "Full Circle".

The song was covered by Finish artist Markku Aro in 1977, titled Keskiyön aikaan – I'll Meet You At Midnight.

References

External links
 "I'll Meet You at Midnight" at Discogs

1976 songs
1976 singles
Smokie (band) songs
Songs written by Nicky Chinn
Songs written by Mike Chapman
Song recordings produced by Mike Chapman
RAK Records singles